The Asia Pacific Institute of Information Technology (abbreviated as APIIT) is an educational organisation specializing in providing education and training programs in computing and information technology. Founded by Datuk Dr Parmjit Singh and based originally in Malaysia, APIIT has since established other centers in Pakistan, India and Sri Lanka. The institute works in collaboration with selected universities in the United Kingdom and has produced more than 14,000 graduates.

History
Asia Pacific IIT was founded in 1993 as part of an initiative by the Malaysian Government to address the shortage of IT Professionals in the country. The newly formed Institute was based in Damansara Heights, Kuala Lumpur and offered Diploma courses in computing and IT.

In the following year, co-operative links were established with Monash University in Australia, leading to the launch of a twinning program in 1995 for Bachelor's degrees. This was followed in 1996 by a twinning relationship with Staffordshire University in UK for master's degree courses.

Expansion led to the opening of the Kuala Lumpur city campus in 1997, followed by campuses in Karachi, Pakistan (1998), Colombo, Sri Lanka (2000), Lahore, Pakistan (2000), Panipat, India (2001) and Perth, Australia (2004). In 2003 the Malaysian campus moved to new premises at Technology Park Malaysia, where it is now known as APIIT TPM.

The curriculum has since developed, with the institution recognize as SUN and Microsoft authorized training center in 1998, a SAP University Alliance Partner in 1999 and a Microsoft Certified Technical Education Center in 2001. APIIT gained University College status in 2004.

Programs and courses
Courses are run at four levels: foundation, diploma, degree and postgraduate.
It also offers English courses at their English Language Center for international and local students Students interested in engineering courses offered by APIIT can apply to its BTech course through NAT 2016 online exam that will be conducted on 3 June 2016.

Foundation program (Pre-university)
The one-year foundation program caters for student who have completed Form 5 studies and prepares them to move into a degree course.

Diploma programs
 Diploma in Information and Communication Technology
 Diploma in Information and Communication Technology with a specialism in Software Engineering
 Diploma in Business with IT

Staffordshire University degree
 BSc (Hons) in Computing with specialisms in:
 Computing
 Web Development
 Multimedia Computing
 Software Engineering
 Mobile Computing
 Artificial Intelligence
 Knowledge Management
 Computer Security
 Biometrics
 Data Analytics
 Information Systems
 BSc (Hons) in Business Computing with specialisms in:
 Business Computing
 Management
 E-Marketing
 BSc (Hons) in Business Information Technology
 BSc (Hons) in E-Commerce
 'BSc (Hons) Engineering

Postgraduate programs
Seven MSc programs are run: in "Software Engineering", "Technology Management", "Information Technology Management", "Multimedia Applications Management", "Electronic Commerce", "Mobile Computer Systems" and ''"Computing".

APU TPM, Malaysia

The Malaysia campus situated (at ) is a purpose-built complex in Technology Park Malaysia, about 20 km south of Kuala Lumpur center, close to the suburb of Bukit Jalil and National Sports Complex.

Facilities

The basic building for classes houses lecture rooms, auditoria, a multi-purpose hall, offices, discussion rooms, social space, cafeteria, library, computer labs and research and development facilities. The library affords access to eJournals and databases, some by arrangement with Staffordshire University. The cafeteria cater to both APIIT students and employees from other companies within the vicinity of Technology Park Malaysia.

Student accommodation is available locally in Vista Komanwel Condominiums, Fortune Park apartments and Endah Promenade Condomoniums. Shuttle bus service operates between the accommodation and campus. Initiative students may also go for alternatives by renting an apartment themselves, which saves them more money during their study period. 7-Eleven located in Arena Green apartments provide a posting board about apartment and car-park rentals, with a usual price range from RM700 – RM850 per unit depending on facilities provided by the unit's tenant.

New campus

APIIT has laid plans to build a new campus in Technology Park Malaysia by the end of 2014 which have been said to be completed since 2011. Due to delays, the new campus was completed in March 2017.

Transport links
The campus is situated close to Bukit Jalil LRT station for electric-trains to various parts of Kuala Lumpur and Selangor. It has excellent road links, by being situated close to the main PLUS North–South Expressway, KESAS Shah Alam Expressway and LDP Puchong–Sungai Besi Highway.

See also
Asia Pacific University of Technology & Innovation (APU)

References

External links
APIIT official website

Colleges in Malaysia
Information technology schools in Malaysia
Educational institutions established in 1993
Universities and colleges in Kuala Lumpur
1993 establishments in Malaysia